Kiel Urban Mueller (July 26, 1944 – December 28, 1990), known professionally as Kiel Martin, was an American actor best known for his role as Detective John "J.D." La Rue on the 1980s television drama Hill Street Blues.

Early years
Martin was born in Pittsburgh, Pennsylvania, and raised in Miami. A 1962 graduate of Hialeah High School, he was a drama student at Miami-Dade Junior College and acted in productions at the University of Miami.

When he was 18, he dubbed voices for "Mexican fairy-tale movies."

Career 
Martin's debut as a professional actor came in repertory theatre in Florida. In the 1960s, he moved to New York and worked as a musician, a dockworker, and a stand-up comedian. After signing a contract with Universal Studios in 1967, he broke 15 bones in a motorcycle accident, requiring 2 years recuperation.

Martin appeared in the film Moonrunners, which was the basis for the television series The Dukes of Hazzard.

In addition to Hill Street Blues, Martin made guest appearances on various television shows between the late 1960s  and the 1980s, including Dragnet,The Love Boat, The Virginian, Father Dowling Mysteries, and Murder, She Wrote. He starred in the short-lived 1987 Fox sitcom Second Chance until its revamping as Boys Will Be Boys resulted in his character being dropped. He also was a regular on the soap opera The Edge of Night.

Personal life 
He was married three times. In 1969, he married Claudia Martin (1944–2001), who was actor/crooner Dean Martin's daughter. They had a daughter named Jesse. The marriage ended in 1971.
He was married to Christina Montoya 1978-80. His final marriage was to Joanne La Pomaroa 1982-84.

Death
Martin died of lung cancer, aged 46, at his home in Rancho Mirage, California.

Filmography

References

External links
 

1944 births
1990 deaths
American male film actors
American male television actors
Male actors from Pittsburgh
Deaths from lung cancer in California
20th-century American male actors
American people of German descent